"Greaze Mode" is a song performed by British rapper Skepta featuring fellow British rapper Nafe Smallz. It was released as the third single from Skepta's fifth studio album Ignorance Is Bliss on 9 May 2019 through Boy Better Know. The song peaked at number 18 on the UK Singles Chart.

Music video
A music video to accompany the release of "Greaze Mode" was first released onto YouTube on 30 May 2019.

Charts

Certifications

Release history

References

2019 songs
2019 singles
Skepta songs
Nafe Smallz songs
Songs written by Skepta